Steffi Graf defeated Arantxa Sánchez Vicario in the final, 4–6, 6–1, 7–5 to win the ladies' singles tennis title at the 1995 Wimbledon Championships. It was her sixth Wimbledon singles title and 17th major singles title overall.

Conchita Martínez was the defending champion, but lost in the semifinals to Sánchez Vicario.

The second round match between Patricia Hy-Boulais and Chanda Rubin was the longest-ever women's match at Wimbledon, lasting three hours and 45 minutes. Rubin defeated Hy-Boulais, 7–6(7–4), 6–7(5–7), 17–15.

Seeds

  Steffi Graf (champion)
  Arantxa Sánchez Vicario (final)
  Conchita Martínez (semifinals)
  Jana Novotná (semifinals)
  Mary Pierce (second round)
  Kimiko Date (quarterfinals)
  Lindsay Davenport (fourth round)
  Gabriela Sabatini (quarterfinals)
  Anke Huber (fourth round)
  Natasha Zvereva (third round)
  Iva Majoli (first round)
  Amy Frazier (second round)
  Mary Joe Fernández (quarterfinals)
  Naoko Sawamatsu (third round)
  Brenda Schultz-McCarthy (quarterfinals)
  Helena Suková (second round)

Qualifying

Draw

Finals

Top half

Section 1

Section 2

Section 3

Section 4

Bottom half

Section 5

Section 6

Section 7

Section 8

References

External links

1995 Wimbledon Championships on WTAtennis.com
1995 Wimbledon Championships – Women's draws and results at the International Tennis Federation

Women's Singles
Wimbledon Championship by year – Women's singles
Wimbledon Championships
Wimbledon Championships